Tasuku (written: 佑, 祐, 亮, 匡, 輔, 資 or 翼) is a masculine Japanese given name. Notable people with the name include:

, Japanese actor
, Japanese voice actor and singer
, Japanese footballer
, Japanese immunologist
, Japanese tennis player
, Japanese actor
, Japanese general
, Japanese hurdler

Japanese masculine given names